Dog grooming  refers to both the hygienic care and cleaning of a dog, as well as a process by which a dog's physical appearance is enhanced for showing or other types of competition.  A dog groomer (or simply "groomer") is a person who earns their living grooming dogs.

Reasons for grooming

Grooming is a vital part in the well-being and healthiness of a dog, which can improve its quality of life. How much grooming a dog needs depends on its breed, age, and health. Regular grooming helps to ensure the dog is healthy and comfortable. While many dogs shed, others such as the poodle, do not shed as profusely and require grooming every 4-8 weeks. 

The main reasons for daily grooming include:

 decreased chance of various health problems, such as thrush, scratches, and other skin problems
 general cleanliness of the dog
 monitoring of the dog's health by checking for cuts, hot spots, swelling, lameness, or changes in temperament, all of which could be indicative of illness
 forging of a closer bond between dog and owner
reducing infestation load of external parasites on skin
avoid matting that can potentially cause health concerns like skin irritation or the entrapment of harmful bacteria in the coat

Tools and supplies

Types of brushes and combs
Curry or curry brush: A tool made of rubber or plastic with short "teeth." The tool is rubbed (or "curried") over the dog's coat to loosen dirt, hair, and other detritus, and stimulate the skin into producing natural oils. They are more commonly used on dogs that have large amounts of shedding, like German Shepherds. They are also used for untangling knots in certain parts of the dog's body, such as ears, paws, or tail. Using a currycomb must be done carefully, as the action of this type of tool can harm the skin of the dog if pulled too hard.

Shedding blade: A metal blade (or "sweat scraper") with short, dull teeth that is used to remove dead hair from certain types of harsh coats, as well as remove matted fur. The shedding blade is not used to cut the hair.
Slicker brush: A brush with fine, short wires close together on a flat surface. It is used on medium-to-long-haired or curly-haired dogs to remove mats. Slicker brushes are typically used after primarily brushing with a bristle or a wire pin brush. They are used to smooth the coat and to take out mats and tangles. They consist of fine wire pins that are secured to a flat base. The pins are bent at an angle approximately halfway down the pin. For heavier and thicker coats, it is recommended to use a brush with stiffer pins. This type of brush comes in a wide range of sizes and degrees of pin stiffness.
Rake: Brush designed to penetrate into a dog's thick coat and remove tangles and dead undercoat near the dog's skin. It is often shaped like a shaving razor and features one or two rows of tightly-spaced pins. Rakes are important grooming tools, especially for double-coated dogs, such as Newfoundlands or Siberian Huskies.
Bristle brush: One of the most widely used types of brushes due to its versatility. Typically, the bristle brush is used on dogs with long coats to finish the coat and to bring out the natural lustre and shine. It is commonly used in daily grooming, as it removes surface dust and dirt. It is important to note that bristle brushes are a finishing tool; they generally do not penetrate the coat. Dogs brushed with a bristle brush only will frequently appear well groomed but will be matted beneath the outer layer. As a general rule, longer and widely spaced bristles are suitable for dogs with longer coats, and shorter and tightly-packed ones are better to use on dogs with short hair.
Wire pin brush:  Has an oval shape and metal bristles set in a flexible rubber base. Useful in separating and untangling the hair of long, wiry, wavy, and curly coated dogs. Some wire pin brushes have polished or coated pins, which prevent scratching the dog's skin during use. Because the coating or polish may wear off over time, the pins should be replaced periodically. Pin brushes come in a variety of sizes, textures, and fullness.
Combination pin/bristle brush: has two different sides - one with bristles, which can be successfully used for grooming the short hair areas of the coat, and another side with pins that can be used for long-coated and double-coated dogs. 
Mat comb: Designed to 'cut' matted hair from the dog's coat without leaving a bald spot. 

Stripping combs/knives: Tools used to help grab the longer hairs on a harsh coat and pull them out by the root. Helps maintain a proper coat in many terriers and schnauzers. Most often used on show dogs.

Other supplies
Shears and clippers: Cutting tools used to remove/shorten hair on certain types of coats or from sensitive areas. Not all types of coats are suitable for clipping, i.e. double coats on breeds such as Border Collies, which should not be clipped unless the dog is matted. The typical pair of shears for dog grooming is between 6.5 and 9 inches long, longer than human hair dressing shears. Some are designed with a blunt tip to prevent any injuries due to movement.
Stand dryers, cage driers, and hand driers: Used to dry the dog's coat. Drying a dog with a dryer designed for humans is not recommended, as it may cause scalp irritation, dry skin, or skin sores.
Shampoos and conditioners: Owners are recommended to use only shampoos, conditioners, and rinses that are especially designed for dogs.
Grooming tables: Tables that provide a secure and productive environment for grooming, but many single dog owners can avoid this expense by simply using what is available in the home. They are normally used by professional groomers and owners who have dogs that enter competitive shows.

Bathing
Dogs can be bathed in a sink, walk-in shower, or bathtub; they can even be bathed outside using a garden hose, provided that the water is sufficiently warm enough to prevent hypothermia. Dogs should be bathed with warm water, as hot water can scald the skin. Dogs with a heavy or matted coat should never be bathed without first being completely brushed out or clipped of any mats.

Many types of shampoos and conditioners formulated for dogs are available. For dense and double-coated dogs, pre-mixing the shampoo with water will help ensure a more even distribution of the shampoo. Do not lather the head, as grooming products can be irritating if they come in contact with the eyes. Additionally, excess water may become trapped in the ear canal, leading to secondary ear infections. Fully rinse the dog after shampooing, as residual chemicals may become irritating to the skin. Most dogs do not require frequent bathing; shampooing a coat too often can strip the coat of its natural oils, causing it to dry out.

Dental care
Dental care is very important and can be addressed while grooming. The dental kits available on the market include everything from special toothpaste to toothbrushes. Many models of toothbrushes include a flexible three-head design, which maintains the proper pressure on all surfaces of the tooth with every stroke. These brushes have side bristles set at 45-degree angles to reduce arm twisting and soft outer bristles for massaging the gums. Toothpaste designed to be used on dogs is usually sugar free toothpaste with different flavoring. Foaming or rinsing is not necessary.

Finishing touches can be added with finishing supplies, including perfumed sprays, ribbons and many other accessories.

Hair removal

The coats of many breeds require trimming, cutting, or other attention.  Styles vary by breed and discipline.  While some hair removal has its origins in practical purposes, much is based on the taste of the owner, whether or not the dog will be shown, and what work the dog does.

The rubber grooming gloves and dog brushes are intended to drag loose hair from the short-coated dogs and are some of the most popular grooming tools amongst pet owners. They are easy to use by massaging the coat in firm strokes, and have the advantage of being suitable for both wet and dry coats.

Some breeds of dog, such as the Lhasa Apso, do not shed, but have hair that grows constantly. As such, the fur around the legs and belly can get very long and become matted, and the hair around the eyes can impair the dog's vision. In such circumstances, hair trimming can be performed to keep the eyes clear and keep the coat free of knots.

Hand stripping

Stripping or hand-stripping is the process of pulling the dead hair out of the coat of a non-shedding dog, either by using a stripping knife or the fingers. A hard, wiry coat has a cycle where it starts growing and then sheds as it reaches maximum length. Hand-stripping coordinates the shedding and makes room for a new coat to grow. Stripping is the proper grooming method for most terriers, spaniels, and many other breeds. The hair is removed with either a stripping knife or stripping stone, with the top coat removed to reveal the dense, soft undercoat. If done correctly, the procedure is painless. Many dogs are reported to enjoy having their hair stripped, especially when they are introduced to it as puppies.

Nail trimming 
Nail trimming is essential for maintaining good health. If a dog's nails are allowed to grow, they will curl over into a spiral shape; walking will become increasingly painful. Uncut nails may curl so far that they pierce the paw pad, leading to infection and debilitating pain. Long nails can put pressure on the toe joints, even causing the joints of the forelimb to be realigned. This can cause the animal to have unequal weight distribution and be more prone to injuries. Longer nails are also more likely to be forcibly ripped or torn off, causing serious pain to the animal.

It becomes increasingly difficult to maneuver nail clippers between the paw pad and tip of the nail as the nails grow longer. Owners may choose to trim nails themselves or may opt to take their pet to a groomer or veterinarian.

Nail trimming is done with a nail clipper. In addition, handheld rotary tools are often used to smooth sharp edges caused by nail clippers. There are two main types of nail clippers: guillotine trimmers and standard scissor- and plier-style trimmers. Guillotine trimmers have a hole at the end through which the dog's nail is inserted; then, as the handles of the tool are squeezed together, an internal blade lops off the end of the nail. The scissor-style trimmer is most effective on nails that have grown too long and are now in the shape of a circle or coil.

Cording

Cording is a technique in which dog coats are separated patiently into dreadlocks for coat care or presentation purposes. Some dog breeds that are often corded are the Puli and the Komondor. The Havanese and the various poodles are also occasionally corded for showing.

The cords form naturally (if messily) in tightly curled fur, but to make them attractive for conformation showing, the cords are carefully started by separating clumps of fur in a regular pattern, and tended until they are long enough to grow on their own. A corded coat can act very much like a dust mop as the dog moves through its environment. Dust, dirt, twigs, leaves, burs, and everything else quickly become tangled in the coat.  To keep the coat attractive, the owner must put in considerable time and effort in cleaning it and in entertaining and exercising the dog in a way that minimizes the accumulation of litter. Such dogs often have their cords tied up or covered with assorted dog clothing when they are not in a clean environment.

Creative 
Additional options that some groomers provide include services such as colouring dogs' fur and painting dogs' nails.

While traditional grooming achieves to conform with breed standards set by the official breed associations, creative grooming heads to the opposite direction, creating a unique, sometimes exquisite look.

The lighter version of creative grooming is known as pet tuning and is more owner-oriented, adjusting the pets' visual appearance to their owners' amusement or life style, while the creative grooming is more of an art form, therefore more artist (groomer) oriented.

See also
 Dog breeding
 Kennel
 Pet store

References

External links
The British Dog Groomers Association 

Dog shows and showing
Animal hair
Dog equipment
Articles containing video clips